Rainbow Stew Live at Anaheim Stadium is a live album by American country music artist Merle Haggard with backing by The Strangers. It was recorded in October 1980 and released in July 1981 on MCA Records.

Background
Haggard moved from MCA to Epic Records in 1981. However, he still owed MCA two albums, and this collection, along with the gospel album Songs for the Mama That Tried, fulfilled his contractual obligations. This LP is notable for showcasing the talents of Haggard's backing band the Strangers, in particular the jazzy solos of guitarist and long-time band member Roy Nichols. The band is augmented by former Texas Playboys Eldon Shamblin, Tiny Moore and Gordon Terry and a horn section to fill out the sound.

In The Running Kind, Haggard biographer David Cantwell observes, "In the studio, these recent drinking numbers had broken a sweat trying to maintain control, but live they didn't even try to keep their cool, especially on fiddle breakdowns that run hot, then burst into flame."

The track "Dealin' with the Devil" was previously recorded by Eddy Raven on his 1980 album Eyes.

Critical reception

Allmusic critic Steven Thomas Erlewine calls the album "a wonderful, swinging album that brings a new spin not only to classics like 'I'm a Lonesome Fugitive' and 'Sing Me Back Home' but also to Hag's newer songs 'Misery and Gin,' 'I Think I'll Just Stay Here and Drink,' and the title track."

Track listing
"Misery and Gin" (Johnny Durrill, Tommy Garrett) – 3:25
"I Think I'll Just Stay Here and Drink" (Merle Haggard) – 3:24
"Back to the Barrooms" (Haggard, Dave Kirby) – 2:24
"Our Paths May Never Cross" (Haggard) – 4:01
"Running Kind" (Haggard)/"I'm a Lonesome Fugitive" (Liz Anderson, Casey Anderson) – 3:35
"Rainbow Stew" (Haggard) – 2:43
"Blue Yodel No. 9 (Standin' on the Corner)" (Jimmie Rodgers) – 2:53
"Dealing with the Devil" (Eddy Raven, Sanger D. Shafer) – 3:45
"Fiddle Breakdown" – 3:48
"Sing Me Back Home" (Haggard) – 4:04

Personnel
Merle Haggard – vocals, guitar

The Strangers:
 Roy Nichols – lead guitar
 Norman Hamlet – steel guitar, dobro
 Tiny Moore – mandolin, fiddle
 Gordon Terry - fiddle
 Ronnie Reno – guitar
 Mark Yeary – piano
 Dennis Hromek– bass
 Biff Adam – drums
 Don Markham – saxophone

with
 Bonnie Owens– backing vocals

and
 Willie Nelson – guitar, vocals
 Johnny Paycheck - vocals

References

1981 live albums
Merle Haggard live albums
MCA Records live albums